Fray Bonaventura Rubino (c. 1600–1668) was an Italian composer.

According to his publications, his origin of "Montecchio di Lombardia" probably indicates that he was from Montecchio in Darfo Boario Terme, one hour east of Bergamo. He was maestro di cappella at the Cathedral of Palermo from 1643 to 1665.

Rubino's 1644 Vespro dello Stellario was reconstructed in 1996 and subsequently performed by 120 musicians, four organs and a large group of vocal soloists, in 12 choirs and with the instrumental groups laid out in a star formation.

Works
Op. 1 Vespro della Beata Vergine - Prima parte del tesoro armonico Palermo, 1645
Op. 2 Messa, e Salmi A Otto Voci, Concertati nel Primo Choro di Fr. Bonaventura Rubino da Montecchio di Lombardia. 1651
Op. 3 Il primo libro de motetti concertati a due, tre, quattro, e cinque voct. Di F. Bonaventura Rubino da Montechio di Lombardia Min F. dedicati all'illustriss. et eccellentiss. signor D. Fr. Martin de Leon, et Cardenas arcivescovo di Palermo 1651
Op. 4 Il secondo libro de mottetti a due, tre, quattro, e cinque voa, con una Messa de morti 'nelfine a 5 concertata 1653 - edition together with the requiem of Mario Capuana (1650), 1999.
Op. 5 Salmi Varii Variamente Concertati con Sinfonie d'obligo, et a beneplacito di F. Bonaventura Rubino da Montecchio di Lombardia. Palermo. 1655. 23 settings of 9 psalms.
Op. 6 Salmi
Op. 7 Salmi 1658

Recordings
Vespro per lo Stellario. Vocal ensemble of the Studio di Musica Antica Antonio Il Verso, Palermo; Coro G.P. Palestrina of Messina; Ensemble Eufonia of Palermo; Ensemble Mille Regretz of Catania; Les Rossignols de Poznan. Ensemble Elyma. Direction: Gabriel Garrido, K617. 2CD
Bonaventura Rubino, Vepres du Stellario de Palermo, YouTube

References

External links

1600s births
1668 deaths
Year of birth uncertain
Italian male classical composers
17th-century Italian composers
Italian Baroque composers
Italian Baroque
Italian Franciscans
People from Darfo Boario Terme